The following are the telephone codes in Zambia.

Calling formats

To call in Zambia, the following format is used:

0yyy xxxxxx Calls within Zambia

Maximum Number Length excluding Country Code: 9 digits

Minimum Number Length excluding Country Code: 9 digits

List of area codes in Zambia

Older area code details

References

Zambia
Telecommunications in Zambia
Telephone numbers